Gandy Belting Company Building is a historic loft building located at Baltimore, Maryland, United States. It is a brick masonry bearing-wall structure built in five sections. The sections built in 1888, 1890, and 1908 are four stories in height. The remaining two sections, built in 1908-1911 and 1911 respectively, are five stories in height. The Gandy Belting Company, (1888-1931) manufacturer of machinery belting.

Gandy Belting Company Building was listed on the National Register of Historic Places in 1984.

References

External links
, including photo from after 1908, at Maryland Historical Trust

Buildings and structures in Baltimore
Downtown Baltimore
Industrial buildings and structures on the National Register of Historic Places in Baltimore
Industrial buildings completed in 1911
1911 establishments in Maryland